Thomas Peirce (26 December 1916 – 15 November 1988) was a Barbadian cricketer. He played in sixteen first-class matches for the Barbados cricket team from 1941 to 1949.

See also
 List of Barbadian representative cricketers

References

External links
 

1916 births
1988 deaths
Barbadian cricketers
Barbados cricketers
People from Christ Church, Barbados